Reynosia jamaicensis is a species of plant in the family Rhamnaceae. It is endemic to Jamaica.

References

jamaicensis
Critically endangered plants
Endemic flora of Jamaica
Taxonomy articles created by Polbot